Antalgic is something to reduce pain, such as:
Antalgic gait
Analgesic medication